Red Studio may refer to:

 The Red Studio or L'Atelier Rouge, a painting by Henri Matisse from 1911
 Red 5 Studios, a computer game
 RED STUDIO, a game project of CD Projekt
 Red Studios Hollywood, a motion picture studio